Kumkol Oil Field is an oil field located in Kyzylorda Province 200 kilometers from the town of Kyzylorda (4°51'02.9"N 65°28'48.9"E). It was discovered in 2008 and developed by PetroKazakhstan. The oil field is operated and owned by PetroKazakhstan.

References 

Oil fields of Kazakhstan